The Virginia Cavaliers football team represents the University of Virginia in the sport of American football. Established in 1888, Virginia plays its home games at Scott Stadium, capacity 61,500, featured directly on its campus near the Academical Village. UVA played an outsized role in the shaping of the modern game's ethics and eligibility rules, as well as its safety rules after a Georgia fullback died fighting the tide of a lopsided Virginia victory in 1897.

Quickly asserting itself as the South's first great program with 28 straight winning seasons from its first in 1888, Virginia football claimed 12 southern championships and was the first Southern program to defeat perennial power (26-time national champions) Yale, in a 10–0 shocker at the Yale Bowl in 1915. During those early days, Virginia established long-lasting rivalries that still continue on: particularly the South's Oldest Rivalry with North Carolina and a heated rivalry with Virginia Tech. Virginia has also played (now FCS) William & Mary annually or biennially for extended stretches since 1908.

Virginia lost its mantle as the region's mark of success between World War I and World War II, but soon thereafter Art Guepe had Virginia winning big again. To avoid the trappings of "big-time football", university president Colgate Darden reduced scholarship and recruiting support, argued against joining the ACC, and declined an invite for Virginia to play unbeaten Georgia Tech in the 1952 Orange Bowl. The Board of Visitors voted to join the ACC anyway, but Guepe left for Vanderbilt and under Dick Voris Virginia embarked on a 28-game losing streak from 1958 to 1960, as Darden retired. Voris left with a record of 1–29, his lone victory a 15–12 nailbiter against Duke. Still limited by a relative lack of funding in those times, his successors managed moderately better records through the 1960s and 1970s.

George Welsh led a dramatic turnaround effort from 1982, and took Virginia to its first dozen bowl games and even its first AP No. 1 ranking throughout October 1990. He was the first ACC coach to reach 100 wins, and retired in 2000 with the most ACC wins (his 85 ranking second to Bobby Bowden as of 2021) of any coach in history. In November 1995, similar to winning the first Southern victory against Yale 80 years prior, Virginia was the first ACC team to defeat Bowden's Florida State teams after they started 29–0 in the conference. The nationally televised event led FSU's President to create the Jefferson-Eppes Trophy, which Virginia again (as of 2021) holds in Charlottesville after winning the latest matchup in 2019.

Virginia remains the only ACC Coastal division program to have ever been ranked AP No. 1 in the nation as an ACC member. The Cavaliers have been participants in one New Year's Six bowl to date, the 2019 Orange Bowl; Virginia's 21 bowl games have also included four Peach Bowls, the Sugar Bowl, and Citrus Bowl, among others. Virginia has thus far produced 11 Consensus All-Americans.

History

Early history (1888–1975) 

UVA football began in the fall of 1886, when two graduate students at the University, former Yale student Charles Willcox who was attending medical school at UVA, and former Princeton student, Richard Reid Rogers who matriculated to the law school, introduced the sport. After seeing the success of Princeton and Yale during their undergraduate careers, these two men brought a knowledge of the sport to the South, an area of the country that had no college football teams. Students at UVA began playing pickup games of the kicking-style of football as early as 1870. In 1874, University students were introduced to the sport of rugby when they played to a scoreless tie against a team of Englishmen from Albemarle County. Eight years later, in November 1883, a football club was reorganized, a constitution drawn up, and officers elected. 75 men competed against one another, but not against another collegiate club. The University Magazine describes how "pluck is cultivated by throttling one's competitor and violently throwing him to the ground." Finally, in the fall of 1887, Willcox and Reid, after garnering interest in their fellow students throughout the year, helped Virginia put its first regularly organized team in the field. But in these early days they had had no one to play. Fortunately, Pantops Academy, a boys' school founded just up the road from the UVA Grounds, agreed to a game on November 13, 1887. After playing to a scoreless tie, a rematch was scheduled for March 1888. The historic first touchdown was scored by quarterback Herbert Barry and the University won 26–0. The following season, on December 8, 1888, UVA would play their first intercollegiate game, a 26–0 loss to Johns Hopkins. The loss did not dampen their enthusiasm for the sport. Virginia returned the favor with a 58–0 drubbing of Hopkins the following season when they went 4–2, with a 180–4 margin in its victories and two close losses to an eight-win Lehigh team and Navy. The 1889, 1890, 1892, 1893, 1894, 1895, 1896, and 1897 teams all claim Southern championships. The  116–0 drubbing by Princeton in 1890 signaled football's arrival in the south. The South's Oldest Rivalry started in 1892, when Virginia split games with North Carolina. The 1897 team had a scoreless tie with Vanderbilt in a game billed as the championship of the South. Serving as early as 1892, the school's first athletic director was William Lambeth, a medical professor at the university, and one of the participants in the major rules committees that were enacted to make football a safer sport. The trend was not welcome in all corners, however, according to University historian Philip Alexander Bruce, who wrote disparagingly of the arrival of "professional athletes in disguise" from all over the country. School President Edwin Alderman, though a tireless proponent of college football, was significantly alarmed to appoint an investigating committee in 1904, and a strict athletic code was written in 1906.

Between 1900 and 1915 Virginia saw coaches change 10 times and achieve 10 winning seasons with help from the likes of tackle John Loyd, fullback Bradley Walker, quarterback Robert Kent Gooch and the South's first consensus All-American in halfback Eugene N. "Buck" Mayer. The 1900, 1901, 1902, 1908, 1914, and 1915 teams claim Southern championships. In 1900 the team gave the Sewanee Tigers its first loss since 1897. The team's captain was tackle John Loyd.  Virginia lost to Pop Warner's Carlisle Indians. Bradley Walker, later a Nashville attorney and prominent referee, once grabbed Hawley Pierce, Carlisle's biggest player, and carried him ten yards with him dangling over his shoulder. Work began in 1901 on  Lambeth Field, propelling sports development at UVA. Along with Walker, "one of the all-time greats in Southern athletic history," the 1901 team featured several prominent players, including tackle Christie Benet, later a United States senator for South Carolina, future physicians guard Buck Harris and halfback Robert M. Coleman, and quarterback Ed Tutwiler, a transfer from Alabama and the son of industrialist and New Market cadet Edward Magruder Tutwiler. The 1901 team defeated Gallaudet, but lost to Georgetown, and so both Gallaudet and Virginia claim titles. The 1902 team beat Carlisle. In 1905, Virginia lost to VPI for the first time, in Hunter Carpenter's senior year. The 1908 team suffered a single scoreless tie to Sewanee. Freshman Archer Christian was trampled to death in the Georgetown game.

1912 featured Virginia in the inaugural South Atlantic Intercollegiate Athletic Association (SAIAA) season. Season tickets were $7.50 for students and $9.50 for alumni when 8,000-seat Lambeth Stadium opened in 1913, with a price tag of $35,000. The season began with three home shutout victories for Virginia, followed later in the season by a home game with Vanderbilt that was billed as The Football Classic of the South. Trainloads of alumni rolled into Charlottesville to watch Virginia crush the Commodores, 34–0, at Lambeth's dedication.

For years hence, it was traditional to designate "a greatest home game" each season. In 1914, it was Georgia—a "Rally 'Round the Rotunda" won by UVA, 28–0, in a drizzle, as Robert Kent Gooch "general-led his men with rare ability", the Alumni News gushed. Betting was heavy on Yale for a 1915 game that ranked as the biggest all-time win at that stage of Virginia's history. No Southern team had ever defeated the Ivy League power until Virginia—led by quarterback Norborne Berkeley and Buck Mayer—won 10–0 in New Haven. Headlines in the Charlottesville Daily Progress read, "Yale Bowl a Soup Tureen—Virginia Eleven Serves Dish of Bulldog Stew!" The 1915 Virginia team was also the only team to beat the "point-a-minute" Commodores. The season's only loss was 9–0 on the road at Harvard. Harvard's only loss was to national champion Cornell. Halfback Eugene N. "Buck" Mayer was the South's first consensus All-American. The University's first-ever losing football season occurred the next year, including a 61–3 payback at Yale. "Played them too early in the season", moaned a 1916 Alumni News. Questions about the role of athletics were cast aside in 1917, dwarfed by a larger battlefront now known as World War I. Athletics were curtailed in 1917 and 1918 "in an effort to adapt this University to the stern necessities of a people at war", according to the Corks & Curls.The war ended, enrollment began to rebuild, and football practice resumed in 1919 with only two lettermen. "All Trains Lead to Charlottesville!" proclaimed posters promoting the "Great Post War Gathering of Virginia Alumni" for the November 15, 1919, home game with Vanderbilt. UVA lost, 10–6, and dropped the traditional Thanksgiving Day game with North Carolina to finish the "start-up" season at 2–5–2.
In December 1919, Dr. Rice Warren was hired as coach in 1920. Warren led the 1920 squad to a 5–2–2 record. UVA also joined the Southern Intercollegiate Athletic Association in 1920, but left with many SIAA teams to form the Southern Conference in 1921. Rice Warren's tenure ended before the 1922 season, and new coach Thomas Campbell guided the team to a 4–4–1 record—not so mediocre considering the '21 team had managed only three points in its final four games. Virginia was a charter member of the Southern Conference in 1921, when it and 13 other schools split from the Southern Intercollegiate Athletic Association. University teams became the Virginia Cavaliers around 1923, and the leader of the first "official Cavs" was Earle "Greasy" Neale. Although his 1923 record was 3–5–1, his teams enjoyed winning records from 1924–27 before falling to 2–6–1 in 1928. Student indifference ran high, participation ran low, and Neale resigned after the 1928 season. Earl Abell took the football reins for two years in the midst of another athletic department reshuffle. The position of athletic director was created, and James G. Driver — a three-year letterman at UVA — was named Athletic Director. Lambeth Field was outgrown by the spring of 1930, as varsity and first-year teams in football, baseball, track, and lacrosse attempted to practice there. UVA historian Virginius Dabney related that spring football workouts were stopped due to the javelins and discus throwers. The University began negotiating to obtain land for a new sports site, and plans were finalized for Scott Stadium to open in October 1931. Land for practice fields between Ivy Road and the C&O Railroad tracks also was acquired. Support for UVA football had become spasmodic—even fraternity brothers were betting openly against the Cavaliers—around 1930, but in 1931, a dynamic new coach named Fred Dawson buoyed spirits. Losing seasons and a lack of athletic scholarships took a toll on Dawson's enthusiasm, however, and he quit after 1933 and was succeeded by Gus Tebell.

Just as frustrated at the dearth of notable wins was university president Edwin Anderson Alderman, who impaneled a committee to study the situation. In 1935 the Southern Conference implemented the Graham Plan, named after the Frank Porter Graham, head of the University of North Carolina system (which included University of North Carolina Tar Heels football and N.C. State Wolf Pack football). The Graham Plan committed the Southern Conference to eliminating any form of subsidization for student athletes that was not available to regular students.  The Cavaliers opted to leave the Southern Conference at the end of the 1936 football season, the year the Graham Plan went into effect. Tebell bowed out after three losing seasons, and was succeeded in 1937 by Frank Murray as the Cavaliers began its status as independent (from conference affiliation).  Although the Cavaliers went 2–7 during Murray's first year, the team was undefeated against state teams in 1938, posting a 4–4–1 record, creating near hysteria in the student body. The 1940s were a time of mixed success for the Cavaliers—largely thanks to the large numbers of students who served in the armed forces—but it was also known as the era of "Bullet Bill."
William McGarvey Dudley, a 168-pounder from Bluefield, Virginia, is often called the best ever to wear a Virginia uniform. Dudley, who wore jersey number 35, ran, passed, kicked, blocked, tackled, and intercepted his way to All America honors. Under Murray, the 1940 team—running out of a T-formation—went 4–5, but improved to 8–1 in 1941, the only loss a 21–19 upset at Yale. In his final game as a Cavalier, Dudley scored 22 points at North Carolina in a Thanksgiving classic broadcast nationally. After a 28–7 UVA win, his teammates carried him off the field. Dudley finished fifth in the 1941 Heisman Trophy balloting. Murray's 1942 squad dropped to 2–6–1, having lost 29 players to graduation and "scholarshipping for Uncle Sam." Until the war ended in 1945, UVA football functioned with makeshift teams—guest stars from other schools enrolled in the University's military units and were thus eligible to play. In spite of a 7–2 season, Frank Murray left, succeeded in 1946 by Art Guepe, who coached seven years with a winning record. In 1947, Virginia defeated Harvard, 47–0, with a team that featured John Papit, George Neff, and Bob "Rock" Weir. The game was significant because UVA was facing its first-ever black player—Harvard's Chester Pierce. The gridiron success of the late 1940s continued into the early 1950s, as Guepe teams—with Papit, Joe Palumbo, and Tom Scott winning All-America honors—lost only five games from 1950 through 1952. The Guepe years ended after the 1952 season, when the coach was wooed away by Vanderbilt in the wake of University President Colgate Darden's refusal to allow Virginia to participate in any postseason football play. Virginia had just escaped being banned permanently from the NCAA for granting athletic scholarships to student athletes, which was illegal at that time. The NCAA's "Sanity Rules" mandated that college athletes were required to work for their tuition, though this rule was often openly flouted (for instance, prior to the 1950 Rose Bowl, it was revealed that at least 16 Ohio State Buckeye football players had cushy jobs with the state of Ohio, including a running back on the payroll of the state's transportation department as a tire inspector). President Darden made a principled argument against the statute, noting the example of teams such as Ohio State, and stated unequivocally that his school had no intention of following the Code as it enabled the powerhouse schools of the Big Ten and SEC to ignore academics and essentially pay to retain football talent. While UVA (along with traditional UVA rivals Virginia Polytechnic Institute, Maryland, and Boston College) escaped being banned from NCAA play, President Darden was concerned about the effect of "big time football" on the academical status of the University. After the 1951 football season, in which UVA only lost one game, the Virginia Cavaliers found themselves invited to the Orange Bowl, which President Darden promptly declined, setting a precedent not broken for thirty years. Also in 1951, professor Robert Gooch wrote the "Gooch Report", which requested that UVA abolish its football program and discontinue giving athletic scholarships. While President Darden was opposed to entirely abolishing the football program or athletic scholarships, he did diminish the number of athletic scholarships given by 80%. This resulted in the departure of Coach Guepe and a series of losing seasons by the football team.

Heated arguments ensued about whether Virginia should join the Atlantic Coast Conference. Athletic Director and former football coach Gus Tebell and President Darden differed sharply—Tebell in favor, Darden worried about the league's academic standards and the belief that Virginia should only align with other Virginia schools—and the Board of Visitors backed Tebell. Virginia was admitted into the ACC on December 4, 1953. The first 9 years in the ACC brought 9 losing seasons and a 28-game losing streak (the equal second worst in NCAA FBS history), lasting from the third game of 1958 until the opening game of 1961. The streak ended in front of 18,000 fans in Scott Stadium on opening day of the 1961 season. Virginia beat William & Mary 21–6. In 1970, George Blackburn's last year, UVA's football program was integrated for the first time, with the signing of Harrison Davis, Stanley Land, Kent Merritt, and John Rainey. Blackburn was replaced by Don Lawrence, who suffered through three consecutive losing seasons between 1971 and 1973. Lawrence was succeeded by Ulmo Shannon "Sonny" Randle, UVa '59. AstroTurf was laid at Scott Stadium in May 1974 and the team still had a losing season, going 4–7.

George Welsh era (1982–2000)
Head Coach George Welsh was hired for the start of the 1982 season, leaving the same position at the U.S. Naval Academy. He spent years as an assistant coach under Joe Paterno at Penn State and brought a winning tradition in his 19 years at the helm. After going 2–9 and 6–5 in his first two campaigns, Welsh guided the Cavaliers to an 8–2–2 season in 1984 with a 27–24 Peach Bowl win over Purdue representing UVA's first-ever bowl appearance and win.

Many UVA firsts continued under George Welsh:
 First-ever unanimous All-America choice—1985, offensive tackle Jim Dombrowski
 First 10-win season—1989, 10–3
 First ACC Championship—1989
 First time ranked No. 1—1990, 4 weeks
 First team to beat Florida State in ACC play—1995

In 1985 and 1986, the Cavaliers did not go to bowl games. In 1987, they started 3–4 but would win the last five games to finish 8–4 with an All-American Bowl win over BYU. In 1988, the Cavaliers started 2–4 but would win their last five games to finish 7–4 with no bowl game. The 1989 season was the greatest season in school history, with a record of 10–3 overall, and the winning of the program's first ACC co-championship. Virginia would go on to lose the Florida Citrus Bowl, the first New Year's Day bowl in school history. Virginia, wearing new uniforms for the first time in 10 years and only the second time in head coach George Welsh's tenure, enjoyed one of the finest seasons in their history in 1994.
Most noticeably, the team switched from white helmets with orange and blue stripes down the middle to dark blue helmets with a "V" over two crossed sabres on the sides.  The V-Sabre logo was designed by Coach Welsh's son Matt. The rest of the uniform changed from predominantly orange and white to predominantly blue and white. Representing a major athletic facility improvement, the artificial turf at Scott Stadium was removed and replaced with natural grass before the start of the 1995 season. Artificial turf was first installed at Scott Stadium in 1974. David A. Harrison III Field was dedicated September 2, 1995, at Virginia's home opener against William & Mary. In 1995, the Cavaliers won their second ACC title. Citing concerns about his health as a primary reason for his decision, Welsh announced his retirement in a press conference on December 11, 2000, where he said simply "I am now, and forever will be, a Wahoo." Welsh stepped down at Virginia at the age of 67 after establishing himself as the winningest coach in UVA and ACC history. He compiled a 19-year record of 134–86–3 at Virginia, including a conference-record 80 ACC wins. Welsh led the Cavaliers to 12 bowl games and 14 consecutive years of winning at least 7 games.

Al Groh era (2001–2009)

With the retirement of a UVA legend, the Virginia faithful were looking for a new coach who could bring the same success to the team that George Welsh maintained throughout his tenure. After Florida State University's Offensive Coordinator Mark Richt accepted the position as head coach of the University of Georgia, initial speculation centered on former Penn State University Defensive Coordinator Jerry Sandusky, with only Sandusky and Richt being interviewed before, on December 30, 2000, Virginia hired New York Jets head coach and former Virginia player Al Groh. His first year was a rebuilding year with the team going 5–7.  Groh then led the Cavaliers to four consecutive winning seasons from 2002 to 2005, including a 3–1 record in bowl games.  The 2002 squad saw the breakout season of quarterback Matt Schaub, who led the Cavaliers to a 9–5 season capped by a 48–22 blowout of No. 12West Virginia in the Continental Tire Bowl. The 2003 team faced adversity with an early season injury to Schaub, but the team rallied to finish the year 8–5, including a victory over Pittsburgh in the 2003 Continental Tire Bowl. The 2004 team reached No. 6 in national polls after a 5–0 start, the Cavaliers' highest ranking since 1990, but they lost 36–3 at No. 7 Florida State and finished 8–4 after an upset loss to Fresno State in the MPC Computers Bowl. The 2005 team finished with a 7–5 record, but included Virginia's second-ever victory over Florida State and a win over Minnesota in the Music City Bowl. The 2006 squad's record slipped to 5–7. In 2007, the team went 9–3 for the season, including a 48–0 shutout of the University of Miami in the Hurricanes' last home game in the Orange Bowl Stadium, as well as setting an NCAA record for wins by two points or fewer (five). Gaining an invitation to Jacksonville, Florida, for the Gator Bowl, they subsequently lost 28–31 to Texas Tech. For 2008, the team started with several big losses, but went on to win four games in a row before losing the last four of the season, finishing 5–7. Virginia's 2009 campaign under Groh started with a stunning 26–14 loss to William & Mary of the FCS (formerly I-AA). It was UVA's first loss to a I-AA team since losing to William & Mary 41–37 in 1986. The 2009 team ended 3–9 and Groh was fired following the last game of the season, a loss against rival Virginia Tech.

Mike London era (2010–2015)

Mike London was named head coach of the Cavaliers on December 7, 2009. London, who was previously head coach at the University of Richmond, was an assistant coach under Al Groh from 2001–04 and again from 2006–07. London became one of only 10 black head coaches at the Division I-A level. In his first season with the Cavs, the team went 4–8 overall and 1–7 in conference play. He followed that up with an 8–4 (5–3 ACC) turnaround season, following which he won the ACC Coach of the Year award, after preseason projections had Virginia finishing fifth in the ACC Coastal Division. The 2011 team registered a win at Florida State for the first time in school history and became the first team in FBS history to win games at Miami and Florida State in the same season. The team earned a bid to the 2011 Chick-fil-A Bowl, where they lost to Auburn 43–24. In 2012, the team suffered a disappointing 4–8 season that resulted in the dismissal of four assistant coaches. Prior to the start of the 2013 season, both starting quarterbacks from the year before, Michael Rocco and Phillip Sims, transferred from Virginia, going to Richmond and Winston-Salem State, respectively. The Cavaliers' downward spiral continued in 2013 as the team, now led at quarterback by redshirt sophomore David Watford, finished last in the ACC with a record of 2–10, losing their last nine games of the season. The following year saw marginal improvement under quarterbacks Greyson Lambert and Matt Johns, but went 5–7, including an eleventh-straight loss to Virginia Tech. Athletic director Craig Littlepage chose prior to the end of the season to retain London for 2015, but fans continued to express dissatisfaction with the play-calling of London and his staff, and some calling for London's ouster. After a third 4–8 season in 2015, London resigned as head coach. Perhaps the most damning feature of London's tenure is that he fared 0–12 in Virginia's rivalry games against North Carolina and Virginia Tech.

Bronco Mendenhall era (2016–2021)
BYU head coach Bronco Mendenhall was named head coach of the Cavaliers on December 4, 2015. Mendenhall soon led Virginia to bowl games in his second and third years, including a surprising 28–0 rout of South Carolina in the 2018 Belk Bowl. These were the first consecutive bowl appearances for the program since 2002–2005. Mendenhall also lead the Cavaliers to victory over their arch-rival Hokies in 2019 to break the 15-year losing streak in a game with the most on the line for both teams in nearly a decade, an exciting de facto Coastal Championship Game that sent UVA to the 2019 ACC Championship Game and 2019 Orange Bowl. Mendenhall became the first coach to bring the Commonwealth Cup and Jefferson-Eppes Trophy to Charlottesville at the same time, on the heels of winning his third consecutive South's Oldest Rivalry game. His 2020 and 2021 campaigns did not fare quite as well, with records of 5–5 and 6–6, including 1–3 against Virginia's rivals North Carolina and Virginia Tech. On December 2, 2021, Mendenhall announced that he would step down as head coach following the Cavaliers' 2021 bowl game. The decision was entirely Mendenhall's choice; he was not forced out and was not leaving for another job. 247Sports reported the Virginia opening would project as one of the "more attractive jobs" on the market, considering "strong in-state recruiting grounds" and it being situated in a "wide-open Power Five conference."

Tony Elliott era (2022–present)
Tony Elliott was named the head coach of the Cavaliers on December 10, 2021. Elliott previously served as the assistant head coach, offensive coordinator and tight ends coach at Clemson University. Elliott signed a six-year contract with UVA worth $25.93 million excluding incentives.

On November 13, 2022, three members of the team were shot and killed in a shooting. The suspected gunman was a former high school running back who was a member of the Virginia team for one season in 2018, but due to a lingering injury was unable to practice with the team.

Conference affiliations
 Independent (1888–1899)
 Eastern Virginia Intercollegiate Athletic Association (1900–1905)
 Independent (1906–1911)
 South Atlantic Intercollegiate Athletic Association (1912–1921)
 Southern Conference (1921–1937)
 Independent (1937–1953)
 Atlantic Coast Conference (1953–present)
 Coastal Division (2005–present)

Championships

Conference championships
The Cavaliers have won numerous conference championships, although the number is up for dispute. In the latter part of the 19th century, conferences were not prominent as much as independent football play was. Retroactively, a list of independent southern football champions has listed Virginia as champion of the South on an independent level 12 times from 1889 to 1908. The forming of the South Atlantic Intercollegiate Athletic Association has been disputed to either have taken place in either 1908 or 1911.

† Co-championship.

Division championships

Head coaches
Virginia has had 42 head coaches since organized football began in 1888. Tony Elliot has been the current head coach since 2022.

Stadiums
1888–1912 Madison Hall Field
1913–1930 Lambeth Field
1931–present Scott Stadium

Bowl games

Virginia has been invited to the Gator, Peach, Citrus, Sugar, and Orange Bowls, among others. The Cavaliers' most recent bowl appearance was in the 2019 Orange Bowl against the Florida Gators. The program's all-time bowl record is 8–13 through the 2019 season. The team has appeared in four consecutive bowl games twice in its history, in 1994–1996 and 2002–2005. Virginia is the winningest team in Duke's Mayo Bowl history with a 3–0 record after its victories in 2002, 2003, and 2018. Virginia also holds the record for largest margin of victory in that bowl after its 28–0 shutout victory over South Carolina at Bank of America Stadium in 2018.

Final poll rankings
Virginia rankings in final AP and Coaches polls.

Rivalries

Virginia Tech

Virginia and Virginia Tech first met in 1895 and have played annually since 1970, with the Commonwealth Cup awarded to the victor since 1996. Virginia last won the Cup in 2019. That win ended a 15-game losing streak in the rivalry in a de facto Coastal Championship Game that sent UVA to the 2019 Orange Bowl, the first New Year's Six bowl for either of the two programs. Virginia Tech leads the series 60–38–5 through the 2021 season.

North Carolina

The teams have played every year since 1919 and began playing in 1895, in what is by far the longest series in the ACC. The name of the rivalry stems from the fact that the two programs were regarded as the best of the South between 1895 and 1910, winning the vast majority of southern championships during that era. The game was played on Thanksgiving Day through 1950, and a sitting President of the United States (Calvin Coolidge) made the multi-hour trip to Charlottesville on Thanksgiving to view the game in 1928. North Carolina leads the series 63–59–4 per Virginia records, though UVA has held the upper hand, 24–14–1, since 1983.

Florida State

The two teams play for the Jefferson–Eppes Trophy. The trophy was created on the suggestion of former FSU President Sandy D'Alemberte, after Virginia became the first ACC program to defeat Florida State on November 2, 1995. To that point, the Seminoles had run up a perfect 29–0 record through their first 3½ years of Atlantic Coast Conference play. Florida State leads 14–4 through the 2019 season. In recent decades the games are sporadic but competitive: since 2005, Virginia is 3–2 against Florida State (as of 2019). Virginia last won the Trophy in 2019 and holds it currently.

Maryland

Virginia and Maryland were ACC "permanent rivals" from 2005–2013 under the two-division system. Many athletes and students on both sides come from the Washington Metropolitan Area. Maryland leads the series 44–32–2, though UVA has held the upper hand, 15–7, since 1991.

Individual honors

Major awards
Maxwell Award
Bill Dudley—1941
Campbell/Draddy Trophy
Thomas D. Burns—1993
Micah Kiser—2017
John Mackey Award
Heath Miller—2004
Ted Hendricks Award
Chris Long—2007
Bobby Dodd Coach of the Year Award
George Welsh—1991
ACC Coach of the Year
Bill Elias—1961
George Blackburn—1968
George Welsh—1983, 1984, 1991, 1995
Al Groh—2002, 2007
Mike London—2011
ACC Player of the Year
Bob Davis—1966
Frank Quayle—1968
Barry Word—1985
Shawn Moore—1989, 1990
Matt Blundin—1991
Tiki Barber—1996
Matt Schaub—2002
ACC Rookie of the Year
John Ford—1984
Ronde Barber—1994
ACC Defensive Player of the Year
Anthony Poindexter—1998
Chris Long—2007

First Team All Americans
 Jim Bakhtiar, FB, 1957
 Will Brice, P, 1995
 Ahmad Brooks, LB, 2004
 Elton Brown, OG, 2004
 Mark Dixon, OG, 1993
 Jim Dombrowski, OT, 1985
 Bill Dudley, HB, 1941
 Percy Ellsworth, DB, 1995
 D'Brickashaw Ferguson, OT, 2005
 Thomas Jones, HB, 1999
 Patrick Kerney, DE, 1998
 Noel LaMontagne, OT/OG, 1999
 Chris Long, DE 2007
 Eugene Mayer, HB 1915
 Heath Miller, TE, 2004
 Herman Moore, WR, 1990
 Shawn Moore, QB, 1990
 Joe Palumbo, MG, 1951
 John Papit, FB, 1949
 Anthony Poindexter, DB, 1997 & 1998
 Ray Roberts, OT, 1991
 Ray Savage, DE/OLB, 1989
 Tom Scott, DE, 1952
 Chris Slade, DE, 1991 & 1992
 John St. Clair, C, 1999

First Team All Southerns
 H. T. Summersgill, End, 1898
 John Loyd, T, 1898, 1899, & 1900
 James Davis, G, 1898
 William Choice, G, 1899 & 1900
 Harry Gerstle, HB, 1899
 Robert M. Coleman, FB, 1899, 1901
 Alexis Hobson, End, 1900
 Virginius Dabney, HB, 1900
 Christie Benet, T, 1901
 Buck Harris, G, 1901
 Ed Tutwiler, QB, 1901
 Bradley Walker, FB, 1901
 Thomas Bronston, End, 1902
 Henry Johnson, T, 1902 & 1903
 Walter Council, T, 1902, 1903, & 1904
 John Pollard, QB, 1902 & 1903
 Clyde Conner, G, 1903
 Branch Johnson, G, 1904
 Hammond Johnson, HB, 1904 & 1905
 Oscar Randolph, QB, 1906
 Henry Cabell Maddux, Jr, End, 1907
 William Gloth, C, 1907 & 1908
 Sam Honaker, QB, 1907 & 1908
 Carlton Elliott, End, 1908 & 1909
 B. R. Cecil, T, 1909
 Forest Stanton, HB, 1909
 Kemper Yancey, FB, 1909
Rube Barker, T, 1914
Harris Coleman, G, 1914
Eugene Mayer, HB, 1914 & 1915
Charles R. Fenwick, T, 1922
G. B. Arnold, HB, 1922
Charles Mackall, G, 1926

Retired numbers

The Cavaliers have retired 6 numbers to date.

Notes:
 1 Posthumous honour.

Retired jerseys
The University of Virginia's athletic department has issued the following statement distinguishing "retired jerseys" from "retired numbers": "Jersey retirement honors Virginia players who have significantly impacted the program. Individuals recognized in this way will have their jerseys retired, but their number will remain active."

College Football Hall of Famers
 Bill Dudley, HB, inducted in 1956
 Earle "Greasy" Neale, head coach, inducted in 1967
 Tom Scott, DE, inducted in 1979
 Frank Murray, head coach, inducted in 1983
 Joe Palumbo, MG, inducted in 1999
 George Welsh, head coach, inducted in 2004
 Jim Dombrowski, OG, inducted in 2008
 Anthony Poindexter, S, inducted in 2020

NFL Hall of Famers
 Bill Dudley, HB, inducted December 6, 1966
 Earle "Greasy" Neale, head coach, inducted September 13, 1969
 Henry Jordan, T, inducted July 29, 1995
 Ronde Barber, CB, 2023 Inductee

Memorable games

1915: Virginia 10 – Yale 0
Betting was heavy on Yale for a 1915 game that ranked as the biggest all-time win at that stage of Virginia's history. No Southern team had ever defeated the Ivy League power until Virginia—led by quarterback Norborne Berkeley and Buck Mayer—won 10–0 in New Haven.

1990: Virginia 20 – Clemson 7
Prior to the arrival of George Welsh, Clemson dominated the series against Virginia. The Tigers had not lost a single game to the Cavaliers and most games were blowouts. Former Clemson coach Frank Howard had referred to the Cavaliers as "White Meat" back in the 1960s and they hadn't lost to Virginia since. Despite Welsh's success, the Tigers' record against the Cavaliers stood at 29–0 after Clemson defeated the 1989 Virginia team that captured the ACC co-championship. Behind a high-powered offense with Shawn Moore, Herman Moore, and Terry Kirby and a strong defensive effort led by Chris Slade, the Cavaliers finally defeated Clemson, which was ranked in the top ten at the time, in the second game of the 1990 season. The win propelled the Cavaliers' rise in the polls, which culminated in a number-one ranking in late October.

1995: Virginia 33 – Florida State 28
UVa managed to win its share of close games as the 1995 season unfolded, including a 33–28 upset victory over second-ranked and previously unbeaten Florida State. Playing on national television in the first-ever Thursday night game in Charlottesville, Virginia stopped the Seminoles at the goal line on the game's final play (in the early morning hours of Friday, November 3, 1995) to preserve the win. With the victory, the Cavaliers ended FSU's four-year, 29-game winning streak against ACC teams since joining the conference in 1992. Florida State became the highest-ranked team to ever fall to the Cavaliers. Virginia and Florida State were later crowned co-ACC champions after finishing the season with identical 7–1 conference records.

1996: Virginia 20 – North Carolina 17
During a generally disappointing 1996 season, the Cavaliers upset the top ten–ranked Tar Heels at Scott Stadium. In the fourth quarter, North Carolina led Virginia 17–3 and, having advanced within the Cavaliers' five-yard line, were about to put the game away. However, Virginia cornerback Antwan Harris intercepted a Tar Heel pass in the end zone and returned it 95 yards for a touchdown. Quarterback Tim Sherman then led the Cavaliers to another ten points, capped by Rafael Garcia's late game field goal, and the defense shut down the demoralized Tar Heels for a stunning 20–17 comeback victory. The defeat cost North Carolina a bid to the Bowl Alliance; coach Mack Brown left UNC for Texas after another highly ranked Tar Heel team in 1997 also failed to receive a Bowl Alliance bid.

1998: Virginia 36 – Virginia Tech 32
Virginia ended the 1998 regular season with a 36–32 victory at Virginia Tech in the greatest comeback in school history. Down 29–7 at the half, the Cavaliers outscored the Hokies 29–3 in the final two quarters. UVA capped its historic rally with a game-winning 47-yard touchdown pass from Aaron Brooks to wide receiver Ahmad Hawkins with 2:01 left to play. As of 2023, this remains UVA's last win in Blacksburg.

2011: Virginia 14 – Florida State 13
Before 2011, Virginia had never won a game against Florida State in Tallahassee. The Cavaliers' record against the Seminoles stood at 2–14 overall and 0–8 in Doak Campbell Stadium. Virginia running back Kevin Parks ran for a touchdown with 1:16 remaining in the game, giving Virginia the lead. Florida State kicker Dustin Hopkins then missed a 42-yard field goal as time ran out, giving the Cavaliers their first win in Tallahassee in school history.

2019: Virginia 39 – Virginia Tech 30
Virginia lost 15 consecutive games to Virginia Tech from 2004 through 2018. Entering the 2019 contest, the Cavaliers and Hokies had identical records of 5–2 in ACC play and 8–3 overall, making the game a de facto ACC Coastal Division championship. Virginia quarterback Bryce Perkins had a total of 475 yards and three touchdowns, while kicker Brian Delaney kicked two late field goals to give Virginia a tenuous 33–30 lead. With just over a minute left, Virginia sacked the Hokies' Hendon Hooker three consecutive times. On the third sack, Hooker fumbled the ball, which was recovered by defensive lineman Eli Hanback in the VT end zone for a touchdown to seal the win, end the losing streak, and send Virginia to its first ever ACC championship game. Virginia went on to make its first Orange Bowl and also its first New Year's Six bowl game appearance.

Current NFL players

As of December 2, 2022.
Oday Aboushi—OT, Los Angeles Rams
Kurt Benkert—QB
Maurice Canady—CB
Anthony Harris—S, Philadelphia Eagles
Darius Jennings—WR
Rodney McLeod—S, Indianapolis Colts
Taquan Mizzell—RB, B.C. Lions
Morgan Moses—OT, Baltimore Ravens
LaRoy Reynolds—LB
Eric Smith—T, New York Jets
Juan Thornhill–FS, Kansas City Chiefs
Brent Urban—DE, Baltimore Ravens
Joe Reed–WR, Chicago Bears
Bryce Perkins–QB, Los Angeles Rams

Notable former players
Tiki Barber—retired NFL running back, New York Giants
Ronde Barber—retired NFL defensive back, Tampa Bay Buccaneers
Aaron Brooks——retired NFL quarterback, New Orleans Saints and Oakland Raiders
Tyrone Davis—retired NFL wide receiver/tight end, New York Jets and Green Bay Packers
James Farrior— retired NFL linebacker, New York Jets and Pittsburgh Steelers
Jim Grobe—head coach, Wake Forest Demon Deacons football
Thomas Jones—retired NFL running back, Arizona Cardinals, Tampa Bay Buccaneers, Chicago Bears, New York Jets and Kansas City Chiefs
Patrick Kerney—retired NFL defensive end, Atlanta Falcons and Seattle Seahawks
Chris Long-retired NFL defensive end, St. Louis Rams, New England Patriots and Philadelphia Eagles, Walter Payton Man of Year Award
Don Majkowski—retired NFL quarterback
Herman Moore—retired NFL wide receiver, Detroit Lions and New York Giants
Wali Rainer—retired NFL linebacker
Terrence Wilkins—retired NFL and CFL wide receiver, Indianapolis Colts
Derek Dooley—former head coach, University of Tennessee Volunteers football
Jon Tenuta—former defensive coordinator, University of Virginia Cavaliers football
Heath Miller—retired NFL tight end, Pittsburgh Steelers
D'Brickashaw Ferguson – retired   NFL Left Tackle, New York Jets

Future opponents

Notes

References

External links

 

 
American football teams established in 1888
1888 establishments in Virginia